1 by Two is a 2014 Indian Malayalam language psychological thriller film directed by Arun Kumar Aravind and written by Jeyamohan. It stars Fahadh Faasil, Murali Gopy, Honey Rose and Abhinaya.

Plot 

Hari and Ravi are identical twins who share a very delicate and special emotional bond. When Hari dies in an accident, Ravi goes into a strange state of psychosis. Yusuf, a cop, tries to uncover the mystery involved in the case.

Cast 

 Fahadh Faasil as Yusuf Marikkar
 Murali Gopy as Dr. Hari Narayan and Ravi Narayan
 Honey Rose as Dr. Prema
 Abhinaya as Raziya
 Shyamaprasad as Dr. Cheriyan
 Sruthi Ramakrishnan as Meghna
 Azhagam Perumal as Narayanan Pillai
 Ashvin Mathew as Dr. Balakrishnan
 Fathima Babu as Ammukkuty Amma
 Rajesh Hebbar as Moulana Sahib
 Baby Meenakshi

Production
The film is Aravind's fourth directorial venture.  Bangalore, Mysore and Palakkad were the major locations where the film was shot.

References

External links

Malayalam Music and Movie Encyclopedia

2010s Malayalam-language films
Indian psychological thriller films
Films shot in Palakkad
Films shot in Mysore
Films shot in Bangalore
2014 psychological thriller films
Films directed by Arun Kumar Aravind